David Lee Marks (born August 22, 1948) is an American guitarist who is best known for being an early member of the Beach Boys. While growing up in Hawthorne, California, Marks was a neighborhood friend of the original band members and was a frequent participant at their family get-togethers. Following his departure from the group, Marks fronted the Marksmen and performed and recorded as a session musician.

Marks joined the Beach Boys in February 1962, replacing Al Jardine on rhythm guitar, and performed on the band's first four albums, Surfin' Safari (1962), Surfin' U.S.A. (1963), Surfer Girl (1963), and Little Deuce Coupe (1963). Because he did not appear on the 1961 single "Surfin'", the first performance by the band that became "the Beach Boys", most historians discount him as a true founding member of the group. In August 1963, he left the band due to personal problems with manager Murry Wilson. Afterward, Marks worked with acts including Casey Kasem's Band Without a Name, the Moon, Delaney & Bonnie, Colours, and Warren Zevon, and studied jazz and classical guitar at the Berklee College of Music and the New England Conservatory.

From 1997 to 1999, Marks returned to the Beach Boys for their live performances. In 2007, he released an autobiography, entitled The Lost Beach Boy. He briefly reunited with the group for their fiftieth-anniversary tour and the 2012 album That's Why God Made the Radio.

Biography

Early years
At age seven, David Lee Marks moved into a house across the street from the family home of the three Wilson brothers, Brian, Dennis, and Carl Wilson, later to become the founding members of The Beach Boys. Describing the neighborhood, Marks noted, "It was run down. There were no sidewalks. The houses were older and the Wilsons lived in a pretty small, modest two-bedroom home. The boys all shared a bedroom. When they got older, Brian started sleeping in the den more and more, which was a converted garage they had turned into a music room. They had a Hammond B-3 organ, an upright piano, and a little hi-fi in there."

As the 1950s progressed, Marks sang and played music with the Wilson family at their Sunday night singalongs. Inspired by a 1958 performance by guitarist John Maus (later of the 1960s Walker Brothers), Marks asked his parents to buy him a guitar, which they did on Christmas Eve, 1958. He began taking lessons from Maus, who had been a student of Ritchie Valens.

In 1959, Marks and Brian Wilson's youngest brother Carl had begun to develop their own style of playing electric guitars.  Brian realized that the combination of Carl and Marks' playing brought a rock guitar sound to his original compositions, and the two teenagers participated in Brian's first songwriting efforts, that led to the band's 1963 hit single "Surfer Girl".

Marks was not on the Beach Boys first recording, "Surfin'" for Candix Records on October 16, 1961; that roster included Al Jardine, a high school classmate of Brian Wilson's, who had been singing and playing stand-up bass with the Wilson brothers and their cousin Mike Love.  Over the next couple of months, Brian experimented with various combinations of musicians, including his mother Audree Wilson, but was not able to secure interest from a major label.

Marks joined the Beach Boys in February 1962, replacing Al Jardine who had left for dental school.  Playing rhythm guitar, Marks would end up performing on the band's first four albums.

The Beach Boys

On April 16, 1962, the Beach Boys recorded a demo session at Western Recorders that produced the masters for the songs "Surfin' Safari" and "409", that would become the band's first double-sided hit, landing them a long-term contract with Capitol Records.

According to biographer Jon Stebbins, Marks's guitar chemistry with Carl Wilson changed the sound of the band. Writing about the difference between the Beach Boys' Candix Records single and their first Capitol Records release, Stebbins stated: Compared to 'Surfin', this was metal. No sign of stand-up bass or folk sensibility on this recording. And the tiny amateurish guitar sound and lazy feel of the [earlier demo] World Pacific version of 'Surfin' Safari' had now transformed into something crisp and modern. "It was Carl and Dave who brought that electric guitar drive into the band", says Al Jardine. "And because of that, Brian was able to expand a little bit."

Marks would continue to sing and play rhythm guitar with the Beach Boys long enough to record on the first four (plus) albums, including the early hit singles "Surfin' Safari", "409", "Surfin' U.S.A.", "Shut Down", "Surfer Girl", "In My Room", and "Be True to Your School".  Marks also played over 100 concerts with the Beach Boys, toured across the United States with them, and appeared on their first string of national TV appearances.   While his time in the band was relatively short, Marks contributed to their tightly knit foundational sound, as well as their youthful look on the early Beach Boys' album covers.

Although it is often assumed that Marks left the Beach Boys because Jardine wanted to return to the band, this was not the case.  Marks and Jardine were both part of the 1963 Beach Boys touring line-up.  Jardine initially returned on a part-time basis to fill-in on bass for Brian Wilson, who had already begun to detach himself from the touring band as early as the spring of 1963.

At the height of their first initial wave of international success, Marks quit the Beach Boys in late August 1963 toward the end of the group's summer tour during an argument with Murry Wilson, the Wilson boys' father and the band's manager, but did not immediately leave the band until later that year when his parents and Murry came to blows over financial and managerial issues.  The first show without Marks on guitar was October 19, 1963, though he would stay friends and be in close contact with various band members for many years, and he would remain, unbeknownst to him, a legal member of the Beach Boys until September 27, 1967.

Post-Beach Boys career
In February 1963, Dennis Wilson was injured in a car accident and his replacement was Mark Groseclose, who went to high school with Carl Wilson. Marks and Groseclose became friends and Marks eventually took over Groseclose's garage band, the Jaguars, which he renamed the Marksmen. The band was initially a side project for the aspiring songwriter, who was growing tired of his songs being passed over for Beach Boys records by Murry Wilson.

After Marks left the Beach Boys, the Marksmen became his full-time focus, becoming one of the first acts to be signed to Herb Alpert's A&M Records in 1964. Murry Wilson reportedly threatened radio deejays in order to keep them from playing the Marksmen's records. Later, the group signed with (and released a single on) Warner Bros. Records, but in spite of packed concert venues up and down the state of California, lack of airplay precluded any further releases. The 2009 release of Marks & the Marksmen Ultimate Collector’s Edition 1963–1965 marks the first-time the entire Marksmen catalog was made available to the public.

In 1966, Marks played with Casey Kasem's Band Without a Name. He then worked with the late 1960s psychedelic pop band, The Moon, along with Matt Moore, Larry Brown, and David Jackson. The band signed a production deal with producer Mike Curb and released two under-promoted albums on the Imperial label.  He also performed with Delaney and Bonnie, Colours (recording lead guitar on their second album), and Warren Zevon. By the time Marks was 21 years old, he had been signed to five label deals and had grown disillusioned with the Los Angeles music scene. In 1969, he relocated to Boston, where he studied jazz and classical guitar as a private student at the Berklee College of Music and the New England Conservatory of Music in 1970–71.

1971–present
In early 1971, after reuniting onstage in Boston with the Beach Boys, despite a chilly reception from both the public and Bruce Johnston, Marks received an offer from Mike Love to rejoin the band, but he declined. Instead, he spent the next 25 years playing with artists like Buzz Clifford, Daniel Moore (writer of "My Maria" and "Shambala"), Gary Montgomery, Jim Keltner, Carl Radle, Leon Russell, drummer-turned-actor Gary Busey, Delbert McClinton, Warren Zevon, and many others, earning a reputation as a solid session guitarist without cashing in on his notoriety as having been a Beach Boy. Marks briefly played lead guitar for Delaney & Bonnie and Friends, but was let go and replaced by Eric Clapton. Marks was also offered the lead guitarist spot in Paul Revere and the Raiders, but turned down the offer because he did not want to dress up in a revolutionary war-era costume every time he played a show. Marks was a close friend of Warren Zevon for many years until they had a falling-out. In 1988, when the Beach Boys were inducted into The Rock and Roll Hall of Fame, Marks was neither invited nor acknowledged at the ceremony, an oversight which was finally rectified in 2007.

Marks eventually rejoined the Beach Boys as a full-time member playing lead guitar in 1997, when Carl Wilson, fighting cancer, was unable to continue touring with the group. After playing another 300 shows as an official Beach Boy again, Marks left the band for a second time in 1999 due to his own health issues when he was diagnosed with hepatitis C.

Marks became a leader in the hepatitis C community, often appearing in the media to raise awareness of the disease.  In 2007, Marks co-wrote The Lost Beach Boy with Stebbins, which detailed his early career and related his "lost years", his health problems, his musical development, and his recovery and acceptance within the Beach Boys community.

On May 20, 2005, the original Beach Boys six-man line-up (including both Marks and Jardine) was memorialized on the Beach Boys Historic Landmark in Hawthorne, California.  The following year, on June 13, 2006, Marks gathered with surviving Beach Boys Brian Wilson, Al Jardine, Mike Love, and Bruce Johnston on the roof of the landmark Capitol Records building in Hollywood, where all five were presented with an RIAA Platinum record Award in recognition of two million in sales of the Beach Boys CD song collection Sounds of Summer: The Very Best of The Beach Boys.  In 2008, following the release of a career retrospective, The Lost Years (released to coincide with his book), he toured the UK as a "special guest" with the Beach Boys.  He also performed with Jardine and Dean Torrence of Jan & Dean, in the "Legends of Surf Music" tour.

On December 16, 2011, it was announced that Marks would be reuniting with Brian Wilson, Mike Love, Al Jardine, and Bruce Johnston for a new Beach Boys album and 50th anniversary tour in 2012. The group appeared at the 2012 Grammy Awards on February 12, followed by a 50-date tour that began in Tucson, Arizona in April. Mike Love commented on working with Marks once again, stating, "David rocks. A phenomenal guitarist. When he does those leads on "Surfin'", "Surfin' Safari", and "Fun, Fun, Fun" it's so authentic. He and Carl committed on playing guitar since they were ten years old and were neighbors with each other from across the street in Hawthorne. He's a fantastic musician and a really fantastic guy to be with. He went through his issues with alcohol, but he's completely cooled out for maybe ten years now. It's going to be really great to be with him." Marks also took over lead vocal duties on the songs "Hawaii" and "Getcha Back" during the anniversary tour.

Following the 50th anniversary tour, it was announced that Marks along with Wilson and Jardine would no longer continue to tour with Johnston and Love; instead, Marks appeared with Jardine and Wilson along with Wilson's band for a short summer tour in 2013 featuring the three. On the tour Marks sang "Little Bird", "Forever", "This Car of Mine", and "Summertime Blues". The following fall, Wilson, Jardine, and Marks joined guitar legend Jeff Beck for a 23 city tour, the foursome appearing on the Jimmy Fallon show to promote their tour. For 2015, Marks and Jardine added vocals to Wilson's solo album (released April 2015); however, Marks was not a part of Wilson's Summer tour to promote the album, instead making several appearances with Love/Johnston's Beach Boys group during the rest of 2015.

Marks and his wife, Carrieann, relocated to southern California in 2013 after living for a decade in North Salem, New York.

In 2017, Marks made an appearance as himself on an episode of Decker.

Marks has been relatively inactive since 2015. Among his most high-profile appearances during this time was an appearance in 2019 with Jardine at the California Saga 2 event to raise money for those experiencing homelessness.

Discography
Solo

 The Marks-Clifford Band "Live At The Blue Dolphin '77" (2006)
 The Lost Years : Limited Edition - triple album Set (2008) Quiver Records
 The Marksmen : The Ultimate Collectors Edition (2008) Quiver Records

The Beach Boys
Surfin' Safari (1962)
Surfin' U.S.A. (1963)
Surfer Girl (1963)
Little Deuce Coupe (1963)
That's Why God Made the Radio (2012)
Live – The 50th Anniversary Tour (2013)

The Moon
 Without Earth (1968)
 The Moon (1969)

Surf City All Stars
Live In Concert (2007)
Acoustic Vibrations (2009)
Live In Concert (2013)

Other appearances
Mike Love, Bruce Johnston and David Marks of the Beach Boys Salute NASCAR (1998)
A Postcard from California (Al Jardine, 2010)
No Pier Pressure (Brian Wilson, 2015)

See also
 Beach Boys Historic Landmark

References

External links
Official website 
David Marks 2008 Interview on ilikemusic.com

1948 births
Living people
American people of Italian descent
American rock guitarists
American male guitarists
American male singers
American rock singers
Berklee College of Music alumni
The Beach Boys members
People from North Salem, New York
Rhythm guitarists
20th-century American guitarists